The Saugor and Nerbudda Territories, was a region of British India, located in the central part of present-day Madhya Pradesh state in central India. It included the present-day districts of Sagar (Saugor), Damoh, Jabalpur, and Narsinghpur. 

The region extended on either side of the Narmada River (Nerbudda). Jubbulpore (now pronounced 'Jabalpur') was the capital and the military headquarters of the territory. The city was one of the candidates for the administrative capital of British India, when the Government decided to move the capital outside Calcutta in 1911.

History
The Saugor and Nerbudda Territories were captured by the British East India Company from the Marathas at the conclusion of the Third Anglo-Maratha War, in 1818. Saugor was the seat of a Maratha governor, and the northern portion of the territory was ceded by the Maratha Peshwa; the southern portion, which included Jubbulpore and the upper Nerbudda valley, was ceded by the Bhonsle Maharaja of Nagpur. 

Immediately after the occupation, the British authorities established a provisional administration under the superintendent of Political Affairs of Bundelkhand. In 1820 a division containing 12 districts was formed which was known as the Agency of the Saugor and Nerbudda Territories. This new division was administered, from Jubbulpore, by an Agent to the Governor-General (AGG). In 1835 the Saugor and Nerbudda Territories were incorporated into the newly-formed North-Western Provinces, which brought together the British Dominions in the southern portion of present-day Uttar Pradesh state.  

In 1842–1843, during the Bundela rebellion, two Bundela landlords rebelled against the British in Saugor district, spreading the unrest to Jabalpur District. Following the uprising the territory was placed again under the administration of an Agent to the Governor-General, Sir William Henry Sleeman, but the arrangement did not work well and in 1853 the Saugor and Nerbudda Territories were reattached to the North-Western Provinces.

In 1861 the Saugor and Nerbudda Territories were merged with Nagpur Province, which the British had annexed in 1853, in order to form the Central Provinces.

See also
North-Western Provinces
Nerbudda Division

References

Subdivisions of British India
Historical Indian regions
1818 establishments in Asia
1861 disestablishments in Asia
States and territories established in 1818
States and territories disestablished in 1861
History of Madhya Pradesh